The Rev. John H. Gray House is a historic house in Eutaw, Alabama.  The two-story frame I-house was built by John H. Gray in the 1830s.  Gray served as the first minister for the First Presbyterian Church from 1826 until 1836.  The house was placed on the National Register of Historic Places as part of the Antebellum Homes in Eutaw Thematic Resource on April 2, 1982, due to its architectural significance.

References

National Register of Historic Places in Greene County, Alabama
Houses on the National Register of Historic Places in Alabama
Houses completed in 1830
I-houses in Alabama
Houses in Greene County, Alabama
1830 establishments in Alabama